Isoptericola hypogeus is a bacterium from the genus Isoptericola which has been isolated from the catacomb of Domitilla in Rome, Italy.

References

Further reading

External links
Type strain of Isoptericola hypogeus at BacDive -  the Bacterial Diversity Metadatabase	

Micrococcales
Bacteria described in 2005